Sonnet 122 is one of 154 sonnets written by the English playwright and poet William Shakespeare, and first published in 1609. It is a member of the Fair Youth sequence, in which the poet expresses his love towards a young man. Although the relationship started exuberantly in Sonnet 18 ("Shall I compare thee to a summer's day") by now it has given way to an almost defensive tone. The poet justifies giving away or losing a notebook ("tables") given him by the youth to record shared events by saying that his memories of them are stronger.

Structure 
Sonnet 122 is an English or Shakespearean sonnet. The English sonnet has three quatrains, followed by a final rhyming couplet. It follows the typical rhyme scheme of the form ABAB CDCD EFEF GG and is composed in iambic pentameter, a type of poetic metre based on five pairs of metrically weak/strong syllabic positions. The 1st line exemplifies a regular iambic pentameter:

  ×  /      ×  / ×    /    ×  /   ×   / 
Thy gift, thy tables, are within my brain (122.1)
/ = ictus, a metrically strong syllabic position. × = nonictus.

Line 4 exhibits a mid-line reversal:

 × /   ×    /    /     × × /  × / 
Beyond all date; even to eternity: (122.4)

Lines 3, 5, 11, and 14 all have potential initial reversals. Line 10 potentially incorporates a rightward movement of the third ictus (resulting in a four-position figure, × × / /, sometimes referred to as a minor ionic):

 ×   /   ×  /  ×     ×  /    /    ×   / 
Nor need I tallies thy dear love to score; (122.10)

However, if "thy" receives emphasis, the line becomes regular again.

The meter demands that line 4's "even" function as one syllable, and line 7's "oblivion" as three.

Notes

References

External links
 Shakespeare's Sonnets online

British poems
Sonnets by William Shakespeare